Each "article" in this category is a collection of entries about several stamp issuers, presented in alphabetical order. The entries are formulated on the micro model and so provide summary information about all known issuers. 

See the :Category:Compendium of postage stamp issuers page for details of the project.

Rab 

Refer 	Arbe

Rajasthan 

Dates 	1948 – 1950
Currency 	12 pies = 1 anna; 16 annas = 1 rupee

Refer 	Indian Native States

Rajnandgaon 

Refer 	Nandgaon

Rajpipla 

Dates 	1880 – 1886
Currency 	12 pies = 1 anna; 16 annas = 1 rupee

Refer 	Indian Native States

Rarotonga 

Dates 	1919 – 1932, 2011-
Currency 	(1919) 12 pence = 1 shilling; 20 shillings = 1 pound
 (2011) 100 cents = 1 dollar

Refer 	Cook Islands

Ras Al Khaima 

Stamps issued 1967–72 were non-postal and are unrecognised.

Dates 	1964 – 1966
Currency 	(1964) 100 naye paise = 1 rupee
		(1966) 100 dirhams = 1 riyal

Refer 	Trucial States

Redonda 

Refer 	Antigua

Republic of China 

Refer 	Chinese Nationalist Republic (Taiwan);
		Taiwan

Republic of Ireland 

Dates 	1922 –
Capital 	Dublin
Currency 	(1922) 12 pence = 1 shilling; 20 shillings = 1 pound
		(1971) 100 pence = 1 punt
		(2002) 100 cent = 1 euro

Main Article Needed

Republic of Maldives 

Refer 	Maldive Islands

Republika Srpska 

Refer 	Bosnian Serb Republic

Republique Libanaise 

Refer 	Lebanon

Rethymnon (Russian Post Office) 

Russia was one of the powers which occupied Crete in 1898. It had a post office at Rethymnon within its
own sphere of administration. Four types were issued, overprinted RETHYMNO, and a total of 37 stamps.

Refer 	Crete (Russian Post Offices)

Reunion 

Dates 	1885 – 1974
Capital 	Saint-Denis
Currency 	100 centimes = 1 franc

Main Article Needed

Rheinland-Pfalz 

Refer 	Rhineland-Palatinate (French Zone)

Rhineland-Palatinate (French Zone) 

Dates 	1947 – 1949
Capital 	Mainz
Currency 	100 pfennige = 1 mark

Refer 	Germany (Allied Occupation)

Rhodes 

Italian colony in the Dodecanese which used the general EGEO issues and had its own stamps inscribed RODI, the Italian name of the island.

Dates 	1912 – 1935
Capital 	Rodhos
Currency 	100 centesimi = 1 lira

Refer 	Aegean Islands (Dodecanese)

Rhodesia 

Dates 	1965 – 1980
Capital 	Salisbury
Currency 	(1965) 12 pence = 1 shilling; 20 shillings = 1 pound
		(1969) 100 cents = 1 dollar

Main Article Needed 

Includes 	Rhodesia (British Colonial Issues);
		Southern Rhodesia

See also 	Zimbabwe

Rhodesia (British Colonial Issues) 

Dates 	1909 – 1924
Capital 	Salisbury
Currency 	12 pence = 1 shilling; 20 shillings = 1 pound

Refer 	Rhodesia

Rhodesia & Nyasaland 

Dates 	1954 – 1964
Capital 	Salisbury
Currency 	12 pence = 1 shilling; 20 shillings = 1 pound

Main Article Needed

Riau-Lingga Archipelago 

Dates 	1954 – 1965
Capital 	Tandjungpinang
Currency 	100 sen = 1 rupiah

Main Article Needed 

See also 	Indonesia

Rijeka 

Refer 	Fiume (Yugoslav Occupation)

Rio de Oro 

Dates 	1905 – 1924
Capital 	Villa Cisneros
Currency 	100 centimos = 1 peseta

Refer 	Spanish West Africa

Rio Muni 

Dates 	1960 – 1968
Capital 	Bata
Currency 	100 centimos = 1 peseta

Refer 	Spanish Guinea

Rizeh (Russian Post Office) 

Dates 	1909 – 1910
Currency 	40 paras = 1 piastre

Refer 	Russian Post Offices in the Turkish Empire

Rodi 

Refer 	Rhodes

Romagna 

Dates 	1859 – 1860
Capital 	Bologna
Currency 	100 bajocchi = 1 scudo

Refer 	Italian States

Roman States 

Refer 	Papal States

Romania 

Dates 	1865 –
Capital 	Bucharest
Currency 	(1865) 40 parale = 1 piastre
		(1867) 100 bani = 1 leu

Includes 	Moldavia;
		Moldo–Wallachia

Romania (Austrian Occupation) 

Dates 	1917 – 1918
Currency 	100 bani = 1 leu

Refer 	Austro–Hungarian Military Post

Romania (Bulgarian Occupation) 

Refer 	Dobruja (Bulgarian Occupation)

Romania (German Occupation) 

Dates 	1917 – 1918
Currency 	100 bani = 1 leu

Refer 	German Occupation Issues (WW1)

Romanian Post Abroad 

Main Article Needed 

Includes 	Banat Bacska (Romanian Occupation);
		Constantinople (Romanian Post Office);
		Debrecen (Romanian Occupation);
		Hungary (Romanian Occupation);
		Romanian Post Offices in the Turkish Empire;
		Temesvar (Romanian Occupation);
		Transylvania (Romanian Occupation)

Romanian Post Offices in the Turkish Empire 

Dates 	1896 – 1919
Currency 	(1896) 40 paras = 1 piastre
		(1919) 100 bani = 1 leu

Refer 	Romanian Post Abroad

ROPiT 

Abbreviation of Russkoe Obshchestvo Parokhudstva i Torgovl (Р.О.П.и.Т. - Русское общество пароходства и торговли), meaning Russian Steam Navigation and Trading Company. The Russian post offices in the Turkish Empire were run by R.O.P.i.T. General issues were in use throughout the period but several local overprints were introduced in 1909. This included the offices at Mytilene, Salonika and Mount Athos. Other Russian POs in Greece were at Kandia, Volos (Thessaly), Port Lagos (Thrace), Khios and Rhodes.

Refer 	Russian Post Offices in the Turkish Empire

Dates  1863 – 1914
Currency  (1863) 100 kopecks = 1 Russian ruble, (1900) 40 paras = 1 piastre

Ross Dependency 

Dates 	1957 –
Capital 	Scott Base
Currency 	(1957) 12 pence = 1 shilling; 20 shillings = 1 pound
		(1968) 100 cents = 1 dollar

Rouad Island 

Refer 	Ile Rouad

Ruanda-Urundi 

Dates 	1924 – 1962
Capital 	Usumbura
Currency 	100 centimes = 1 franc

Main Article Needed 

See also 	Belgian Congo;
		Burundi;
		Rwanda

Rumania 

Refer 	Romania

Russia 

Stamps issued are cat. nos 63–11 onwards of Russia.

Dates 	1992 –
Capital 	Moscow
Currency 	100 kopecks = 1 Russian ruble

Main Article Needed 

Includes 	Russia (pre–Soviet)

See also 	Union of Soviet Socialist Republics (USSR)

Russia (pre-Soviet) 

Stamps issued were cat. nos 1–324 of Russia.

Dates 	1858 – 1923
Capital 	Moscow
Currency 	100 kopecks = 1 Russian ruble

Refer 	Russia

Russia (German Occupation) 

Refer 	Ostland;
		Ukraine (German Occupation)

Russian Army Issues 

Refer 	North Western Army;
		Northern Army;
		Western Army

Russian Civil War Issues 

The Russian Civil War (25 October 1917 – October 1922) was a multi-party war in the former Russian Empire fought between the Bolshevik Red Army and the White Army, the loosely allied anti-Bolshevik forces. Many foreign armies warred against the Red Army, notably the Allied Forces and the pro-German armies. The Red Army defeated the White Armed Forces of South Russia in Ukraine and the army led by Aleksandr Kolchak in Siberia in 1919. The remains of the White forces commanded by Pyotr Nikolayevich Wrangel were beaten in the Crimea and were evacuated in the autumn of 1920.

Stamps were issued by various Russian armies and other parties.

Includes 	Amur Province;
		Ataman Semyonov Regime (Transbaikal);
		Crimea;
		Denikin Government;
		Don Territory;
		Far Eastern Republic;
		Kolchak Government (Siberia);
		Kuban Territory;
		North Ingermanland;
		North Western Army;
		Northern Army;
		Priamur & Maritime Provinces;
		Siberia (Czechoslovak Army);
		Transbaikal Province;
		Western Army;
		Wrangel Government

See also 	USSR Issues for the Far East

Russian Occupation Issues 

Main Article Needed 

Includes 	North Korea (Russian Occupation);
		South Lithuania (Russian Occupation)

Russian Post Offices Abroad 

Main Article Needed 

Includes 	China (Russian Post Offices);
		Crete (Russian Post Offices)

Russian Post Offices in the Turkish Empire 

Russia had many post offices in the Turkish Empire which were run by ROPiT. General issues were in use
throughout the period but several local overprints were introduced in 1909. This included the offices at
Mytilene, Salonika and Mount Athos. Other Russian POs in Greece were at Kandia, Volos (Thessaly),
Port Lagos (Thrace), Khios and Rhodes.

Dates 	1863 – 1914
Currency 	(1863) 100 kopecks = 1 Russian ruble
		(1900) 40 paras = 1 piastre

Main Article Needed 

Includes 	Beirut (Russian Post Office);
		Constantinople (Russian Post Office);
		Dardanelles (Russian Post Offices);
		Jaffa (Russian Post Office);
		Jerusalem (Russian Post Office);
		Kerrasunde (Russian Post Office);
		Mount Athos (Russian Post Office);
		Mytilene (Russian Post Office);
		Rizeh (Russian Post Office);
		Salonika (Russian Post Office);
		Smyrne (Russian Post Office);
		Trebizonde (Russian Post Office)

Russian Zone (General Issues) 

Dates 	1948 – 1949
Capital 	East Berlin
Currency 	100 pfennige = 1 mark

Refer 	Germany (Allied Occupation)

Russkoe Obshchestvo Parokhudstva i Torgovll 

Refer 	ROPiT

Rustenburg 

Dates 	1900 – 1902
Currency 	12 pence = 1 shilling; 20 shillings = 1 pound

Refer 	Transvaal

Rwanda 

Dates 	1962 –
Capital 	Kigali
Currency 	100 centimes = 1 franc

Main Article Needed 

See also 	Ruanda-Urundi

Ryukyu Islands 

Dates 	1948 – 1972
Capital 	Naha
Currency 	(1948) 100 sen = 1 yen
		(1958) 100 cents = 1 dollar

Main Article Needed

References

Bibliography
 Stanley Gibbons Ltd, Europe and Colonies 1970, Stanley Gibbons Ltd, 1969
 Stanley Gibbons Ltd, various catalogues
 Stuart Rossiter & John Flower, The Stamp Atlas, W H Smith, 1989
 XLCR Stamp Finder and Collector's Dictionary, Thomas Cliffe Ltd, c.1960

External links
 AskPhil – Glossary of Stamp Collecting Terms
 Encyclopaedia of Postal History
 In Russian: Information Center "Russia and World" (2,200+ articles & references).

Ra